Andrea L. Graham is a professor of ecology and evolutionary biology and the co-director of the Global Health Program at Princeton University. She works in the area of immunoparasitology to understand the relationship between host defense response and parasite transmission.  In 2018, she was named a National Academy of Sciences Kavli Fellow. From 2006 to 2010, she was awarded a BBSRC David Phillps Fellowship to investigate immune responses to co-infection while at the University of Edinburgh.

Graham holds an A.B. in Biological Sciences & Sculpture from Mount Holyoke College and a PhD in Ecology & Evolutionary Biology at Cornell University.

References

External links 

 
 The Graham Group Lab homepage

Cornell University alumni
American ecologists
Women ecologists
Living people
Year of birth missing (living people)
Princeton University faculty
Mount Holyoke College alumni